The pan-Slavic colors— red, blue and white—were defined by the Prague Slavic Congress, 1848, based on the flag of Russia, which was introduced in the late 17th century. The tricolor flag of Russia was itself inspired by the flag of the Netherlands. Historically, many Slavic nations and states adopted flags and other national symbols that used some combination of those three colors. Slavic countries that use or have used the colors include: Russia, Yugoslavia, Czechoslovakia, Czech Republic, Montenegro, Slovakia, Croatia, Serbia and Slovenia. On the other hand, Belarus,  Bulgaria, North Macedonia, Poland and Ukraine have never adopted all the colors.

Yugoslavia, both the Kingdom (Kingdom of Yugoslavia, 1918–1943) and the Republic (SFR Yugoslavia, 1943–1992) was a union of several Slavic nations, and therefore not only sported the pan-Slavic colors but adopted the pan-Slavic flag as its own (later adding a red star). The later Federal Republic of Yugoslavia (1992–2003); a federation of Serbia and Montenegro, and its successor state, the State Union of Serbia and Montenegro (2003–2006) also used the pan-Slavic flag until the final dissolution of Yugoslavia in 2006. Serbia continues to use a flag with all three Pan-Slavic colors, along with Russia, Croatia, Slovakia and Slovenia.

Most flags with pan-Slavic colors have been introduced and recognized by Slavic nations following the first Slavic Congress of 1848. Ethnic flag of Sorbs (blue-red-white) had already been designed in 1842. Czech Moravians proclaimed their flag (white-red-blue) at the very congress. The flag of Croatia with its modern tricolor (red-white-blue) was first designed by Croatian viceroy Josip Jelačić for the then-concepted Triune Kingdom (officially adopted by the Kingdom of Croatia) in 1848. The flag of Slovenia (white-blue-red) was created in 1848 by a group of Slovenian intellectuals in Vienna, Austria. The first Slovak flag (in reverse layout – red-blue-white) was also introduced in 1848 and flown by Slovak revolutionaries. The flag of Czech Republic adopted its three national colors in 1920 with the founding of Czechoslovakia.

Examples of flags with Pan-Slavic colors

See also
Nordic Cross flag
Pan-Arab colors
Pan-African colours
Pan-nationalism
Pan-Slavism
National colours of the Czech Republic

Notes

References

Color schemes
Slavic culture
Colors, Pan-Slavic
Colors
Flags by colour
Color in culture